Shlomi Shabat  (born August 30, 1954) is an Israeli vocalist and musician. He is of Turkish Eastern Sephardic Jewish origin.

Early life
Shabat was born in Yehud, Israel, to a family of Sephardic Jewish descent who immigrated from Turkey. He sings in Hebrew, Turkish, and Spanish.

Musical career
His CDs include Friends and Live in Caesaria, in which he sings with other Israeli artists, including his sister Lea Shabat, Shiri Maimon, and Lior Narkis.

In 2002, he was nominated for the Tamuz Award of Israel's Best Male Artist, along with David D'Or, Arkadi Duchin, Yuval Gabay, and Yehuda Poliker,  but lost out to D'Or.

In 2006, Shabat released a CD which contains duets and is named Friends 2. It was his ninth solo album, and was made in the same style as the first Friends duets album from 2001.

Shabat sang a duet with David D'Or on D'Or's CD, Kmo HaRuach ("Like the Wind"), which was released on March 27, 2006.
Ein od milevado

Television career
Shlomi Shabat was one of the judges in the inaugural season of The Voice Israel on Israeli television.

Discography
 I've Returned From the Dark - 1987 - מן החושך חזרתי
 Because of the Wind - 1989 - בגלל הרוח
 Don't Go Too Far - 1991 - אל תלכי רחוק מדי
 An Hour Together - 1993 - שעה אחת ביחד
 Shlomi Shabat - 1998 - שלומי שבת
 Friends - 2001 - חברים
 Golden Hits - 2001 - להיטי זהב
 Time of Love - 2003 - זמן אהבה
 Shlomi Shabat in Cesarea - 2005 - המופע המשותף בקיסריה
 Friends 2 - 2006 - חברים 2

References

1954 births
Living people
Israeli Sephardi Jews
20th-century Israeli male singers
Israeli pop singers
Israeli people of Turkish-Jewish descent
Jewish singers
Israeli Mizrahi Jews
People from Central District (Israel)
21st-century Israeli male singers